The Arau railway station is a Malaysian railway station located at and named after the town of Arau, Perlis.

The current railway station was built as part of the Ipoh–Padang Besar Electrification and Double-Tracking Project, which was completed in December 2014. The new station replaced an old wooden single platform station that closed on 22 June 2011.

Location and locality 
As the name denotes, it is located in the town of Arau, Perlis and being a royal town, it is located near Arau Palace where the Raja of Perlis resides. The new name of Stesen Diraja (Royal Station) also denotes its significance to the royal town. It is also located around 10 kilometres to the state capital, Kangar.

ETS and Komuter services do make a stop here and the location is considered very strategic in Perlis  as it is near to Arau bus station that serves bus routes to Kangar, Changlun and Alor Setar, and there's also taxi services that may drive passengers to Kuala Perlis, well known being one of the main jetty for Langkawi Island in Kedah. Due to that fact, passengers going to the island mostly alight at this station as well as people going to Kangar and places nearby.

It also serves Pauh nearby, where Universiti Malaysia Perlis (UniMAP) is located.

See also
 Rail transport in Malaysia

References

Arau
KTM ETS railway stations
Railway stations in Perlis
Railway stations opened in 1917